Jared Jenkins (born April 26, 1989) is a former Arena football wide receiver/defensive back. Jenkins was signed by the Milwaukee Mustangs as an undrafted free agent in 2011. Jenkins completed his college career at Wisconsin-Stevens Point.

Professional career

Milwaukee Mustangs
Jenkins joined the Milwaukee Mustangs of the Arena Football League in 2012. He started all 18 games and caught 119 passes for 1,610 yards and 34 touchdowns.

Utah Blaze
Jenkins joined the Utah Blaze during preseason camp in 2013. One week before the season started, the Blaze placed Jenkins on recallable assignment.

Chicago Rush
With the Blaze failing to trade or activate Jenkins, the Chicago Rush claimed Jenkins after Week 1 of the regular season.

References

External links
 Utah Blaze Bio

1989 births
Living people
Players of American football from Milwaukee
American football wide receivers
American football defensive backs
Wisconsin–Stevens Point Pointers football players
Milwaukee Mustangs (2009–2012) players
Utah Blaze players
Chicago Rush players
Rufus King International High School alumni